Woterfitzsee is a lake in the Mecklenburgische Seenplatte district in Mecklenburg-Vorpommern, Germany. At an elevation of 58.8 m, its surface area is 2.9 km².

External links 
 

Lakes of Mecklenburg-Western Pomerania